Southorpe is a settlement and civil parish in the Peterborough district, in the ceremonial county of Cambridgeshire, England. For electoral purposes it forms part of Barnack ward in North West Cambridgeshire constituency.

See also
Southorpe Meadow
Southorpe Paddock
Walcot Hall

External links

Hamlets in Cambridgeshire
Geography of Peterborough
Civil parishes in Cambridgeshire